This is a list of the squads selected for the 1993 FIFA U-17 World Championship.

Group A

Japan

Head coach:  Tadatoshi Komine

Ghana

Head coach:  Isaac Paha

Italy

Head coach:  Sergio Vatta

Mexico

Head coach:  Juan Manuel Álvarez

Group B

Australia

Head coach:  Les Scheinflug

Argentina

Head coach:  Reinaldo Merlo

Canada

Head coach:  Bert Goldberger

Nigeria

Head coach:  Fanny Ikhayere Amun

Group C

Colombia

Head coach:  German González García

Qatar

Head coach:  Humberto Redes Filho

United States

Head coach:  Roy Rees

Representation of Czechs and Slovaks (RCS)

Head coach:  Józef Krejča

 Only 17 players in RCS squad. (N°16) MF Patrik Jezek 28/12/1976 FC Viktoria Plzen.

Group D

Chile

Head coach:  Leonardo Véliz

China

Head coach:  Zhicheng Zhang

 Only 17 players in China squad. (12) Lin Jinyu FW 07/06/1977 Liaoning Zhongshun

Tunisia

Head coach:  Jameleddine Abassi

 Only 17 players in Tunisia squad. (14) Imed Mhedhebi FW 03/22/1976 Etoile du Sahel.

Poland

Head coach:  Andrzej Zamilski

Fifa U-17 World Championship Squads, 1993
FIFA U-17 World Cup squads